Petroica is a genus of Australasian robins, named for their red and pink markings. They are not closely related to the European robins nor the American robins.

The genus was introduced by the English naturalist, William John Swainson, in 1829, with the Norfolk robin (Petroica multicolor) as the type species. The generic name combines the Ancient Greek petro- "rock" with oikos "home".

Many species in Australia have a red breast and are known colloquially as "red robins" as distinct from the "yellow robins" of the genus Eopsaltria.

Species and subspecies
The genus contains the following 14 species:

References

 Del Hoyo, J.; Elliot, A. & Christie D. (editors). (2006). Handbook of the Birds of the World. Volume 12: Picathartes to Tits and Chickadees. Lynx Edicions.

Further reading

External links

 
Bird genera
Taxa named by William John Swainson